Md. Zahurul Islam is a Bangladesh Nationalist Party politician and the former Member of Parliament of Bogra-6.

Career
Islam was elected to parliament from Bogra-6 as a Bangladesh Nationalist Party candidate in September 1996 in a by-election. The by-election were called after Khaleda Zia, who was elected from constituency including Bogra-6, resigned and choose to represent Feni-1.

References

Bangladesh Nationalist Party politicians
Living people
7th Jatiya Sangsad members
Year of birth missing (living people)